Panjapurisvarar Temple, Panchakkai is a Siva temple in Mayiladuthurai district in Tamil Nadu (India).

Vaippu Sthalam
It is one of the shrines of the Vaippu Sthalams sung by Tamil Saivite Nayanar Appar.

Presiding deity
The presiding deity is Panjapurisvarar.

Other Shrines
The presiding deity is kept in a shed. Sculptures of Gnanasambandar, Appar and Sundarar are found.

References

External links
 மூவர் தேவார வைப்புத்தலங்கள், பஞ்சாக்கை - panjAkkai, Sl.No.201
 தேவார வைப்புத்தலங்கள், பஞ்சாக்கை, Sl.No.101

Shiva temples in Mayiladuthurai district